Zieria arborescens, commonly known as the tree zieria or stinkwood, is a plant in the citrus family Rutaceae and is endemic to eastern Australia.  It is a bushy shrub or small tree with branches that are ridged and scaly or hairy, at least when young. It has leaves composed of three leaflets and groups of flowers with four white petals, the groups usually shorter than the leaves.

Description
Its branches are ridged where older leaves have fallen and are usually scaly or hairy, at least when young. The edges of the leaves are more or less rolled downwards with the upper surface dark green and glabrous while the lower surface is hairy and pale in colour. Both surfaces of the leaf are dotted with oil glands.

The flowers are white or pale pink and are arranged in large groups in upper leaf axils, the groups usually shorter than the leaves. In common with other zierias, there are only four stamens. Flowering occurs from September to November and is followed by a capsule containing seeds which have an ant-attracting elaiosome.

Taxonomy and naming
Zieria arborescens was first formally described in 1811 by English taxonomist John Sims and the description was published in Botanical Magazine. The original specimen was from Joseph Banks's collection in London. The specific epithet (arborescens) is derived from the Latin word arbor meaning "tree" with the suffix -escens meaning "about to become" or "almost".

Three subspecies have been described and others remain in the manuscript stage:
Zieria arborescens subsp. arborescens;
Zieria arborescens subsp. decurrens;
Zieria arborescens subsp. glabrifolia.

Distribution and habitat
This zieria occurs in Queensland, New South Wales, Victoria and Tasmania, growing in wet forest and at the margins of rainforest. Subspecies glabrifolia only occurs on the New England Tablelands between the Girraween National Park in Queensland and Torrington in New South Wales. Subsp. decurrens is only recorded from near Jervis Bay where it grows in drier eucalyptus areas and features ridged non-warty branches and more hairs on the young branchlets.

References

External links
 

arborescens
Sapindales of Australia
Flora of New South Wales
Flora of Queensland
Flora of Victoria (Australia)
Flora of Tasmania
Plants described in 1811